"Marble Phone" is a song by Swedish rapper Yung Lean featuring American rapper Kreayshawn, released in 2013. It is the first official single released by Yung Lean.

Track listing

Personnel
Yung Lean – Vocals
Kreayshawn – Vocals

Production

Yung Sherman – Producer 
White Armor – Producer

References

2013 debut singles
2013 songs
Yung Lean songs
Kreayshawn songs